Abzy Movies is a Hindi language movie channel owned by Skystar Entertainment Pvt Ltd.
Generally it is an advertisement  channel. It shows only advertisement

References

Skystar Entertainment
Hindi-language television channels in India
Television channels and stations established in 2014
Hindi-language television stations
Television stations in Mumbai
Companies based in Mumbai
Movie channels in India